Tommy Sowers (born February 23, 1976) is an American entrepreneur, academic and politician. He had an 11-year career in the Army, achieving the rank of Major. During his military career he served as an assistant professor at the United States Military Academy at West Point. He went on to teach at Missouri University of Science and Technology, and Duke University. He most recently serves as President and Chief Operating Officer of a private jet operator.

As a politician he is most known for his 2009-10 Congressional campaign, during which he received national attention for his call to end the conventional war in Afghanistan, his fundraising and innovative use of social media to connect with voters. After the campaign he focused his attentions on working in the nonprofit sector with Iraq and Afghanistan War veterans to improve their lives and the lives of their families.
  
He is the co-founder of GoldenKey Networks Inc. which includes GoldenKey, a venture backed real estate startup. In 2018 Landis acquired GoldenKey.

Sowers served as the Southeast Regional Director of NSIN--National Security Innovation Network, part of the Defense Innovation Unit, a US Department of Defense program.

Early life and education
Born and raised in Rolla, Missouri, Sowers graduated from Rolla High School in 1994 and lettered in both golf and soccer. During his senior year he cross enrolled in computer science at the University of Missouri at Rolla (later MS&T) and conducted research for the Bureau of Mines. He attended Duke University on an ROTC scholarship, where he led both the ROTC detachment and the Interfraternity Council.  He was a Rhodes finalist from Missouri and graduated cum laude with an A.B. in public policy in 1998. Sowers went on to complete a PhD program at the London School of Economics in 2011. His dissertation was entitled "Nanomanagement--Superior Control and Subordinate Autonomy in Conflict" and it explored how technology adopted by hierarchical organizations dramatically affects how superiors monitor and direct the actions of subordinates.

Career

U.S. Army 

In 1998, Sowers was commissioned in the U.S. Army Corps of Engineers. First assigned to the 1st Infantry Division, Sowers led a combat engineering platoon in the NATO campaign during the Kosovo War. While stationed in Germany, he represented his division in the Best Ranger Competition as well as an Eco challenge. Between 2004 and 2006, while at 10th Special Forces Group, Sowers served two deployments in the Iraq war as a Green Beret, leading and advising U.S. and Iraqi units on counterinsurgency operations. During his 11-year military career, Sowers was awarded the Combat Infantryman Badge, Senior Parachutist Badge, Military Freefall Badge, Ranger Tab, Special Forces Tab, Belgian Commando School Brevet, two Bronze Stars, Joint Service Commendation Medal, NATO Service Ribbon, and numerous Distinguished Honor Graduate awards.  He left the Army with the rank of Major.

U.S. Department of Veterans Affairs
On May 9, 2012, President Barack Obama nominated Sowers to be Assistant Secretary for Public and Intergovernmental Affairs at the United States Department of Veterans Affairs.  Sowers testified before the United States Senate Committee on Veterans' Affairs on July 18, 2012 and was introduced to the committee by Senator Claire McCaskill.  Sowers was confirmed by the full Senate on August 2, 2012, at the time the youngest Senate confirmed Assistant Secretary in the nation, and was sworn into office on August 20, 2012.

While at the VA, Sowers represented and advised the Secretary of Veterans Affairs on matters relating to media relations, public affairs, and intergovernmental affairs.  He has testified before the Senate Committee on Veterans' Affairs regarding the VA's efforts to increase the number of veterans accessing their VA benefits. Sowers served as a primary spokesman for the VA, making appearances in numerous national print and televised media. He served in the post until April 2014.

Collegiate Teaching 
From 2006 to 2009, Sowers served as an assistant professor at the United States Military Academy at West Point, teaching courses in American Government, Advanced American Government and Media & Politics. While at West Point, Sowers led a cadet summer trip to India, focused on service learning in the Himalayas and interaction with the Tibetan Government in Exile, including an audience with the Dalai Lama. In fall 2009, Sowers taught in the History and Political Science Department at the Missouri University of Science and Technology in Rolla, Missouri.

In April 2014, Sowers accepted a position as visiting faculty in the Sanford School of Public Policy at Duke University.

In 2018 he was reappointed as visiting faculty in Duke's Department of Political Science to teach the first iteration of Hacking for Defense in spring 2019. Hacking for Defense was featured in NPR and in Duke Magazine.

Business and Entrepreneurial Experience 
In 2011, Sowers became a management consultant with McKinsey and Company.  During his time at McKinsey he was trained in their mini-MBA program and served private equity clients in assessing mergers and acquisitions, predominately in Latin America.

In 2015, Sowers, along with fellow founders Shayne Sowers and Narayan Krishnan, created a firm now known as GoldenKey an online marketplace in the real estate industry. 

In March 2016, Fortune Magazine listed GoldenKey as a top Raleigh-Durham start-up to watch. During the summer 2016, Sowers led GoldenKey through its participation in the NFX Guild accelerator program. In 2016, GoldenKey was named by CNN as one of the five startups "changing the real estate game".

In 2017, Forbes named Goldenkey as one of the top 25 veteran founded start-ups.

NSIN--National Security Innovation Network 
In 2018 Sowers rejoined federal service as Southeast Regional Director of MD5 National Security Technology Accelerator, a US Department of Defense program researching ways to improve the problem-solving capacity of war-fighters.

flyExclusive - President and Chief Operating Officer 

On July 7, 2021, flyExclusive, the fourth-largest Part 135 private jet operator named Tommy Sowers as President.

Political Endeavors 

In September 2009, Sowers announced his candidacy for Congress against incumbent Representative Jo Ann Emerson.  Libertarian Rick Vandeven and Independent Larry Bill also ran.

On Veterans Day 2009, former Clinton White House official Paul Begala featured Sowers in an op-ed, calling the candidate "everything you'd want in an up-and-coming young leader: brave and battle-tested, deeply rooted in his community and passionate about bringing change and progress to his long-neglected corner of Missouri."

In January 2010, Sowers traveled around all twenty-eight counties in the district in a project dubbed "Boots on the Ground." Sowers worked a job in every county, garnering a great deal of local press.  Boots on the Ground's success led to a mention from former Governor of Vermont Howard Dean on MSNBC, predicting Sowers "is going to knock off, I think, Jo Ann Emerson."  In July, Sowers embarked on Boots on the Ground II, again working a job in every county.

Sowers was added to the Democratic Congressional Campaign Committee's top races, the "Red to Blue" program.

Sowers raised over $1.5 million in the 2010 cycle. Sowers out raised all of his opponents, including Emerson, two out of the four quarters. Sowers was endorsed by General Wesley Clark and his organization VoteVets, which aims to put more veterans in Congress.  He was also endorsed by two Medal of Honor recipients: Retired Colonel Jack H. Jacobs and former U.S. Senator Bob Kerrey.

In a profile in mid-April, Politico's Jonathan Martin called Sowers "one of the party's most promising recruits." In August, Sowers released his first ad, Combat Bible, which highlighted his military credentials. The ad was met with praise from Politico's Ben Smith, who called the ad "How to run against a GOP incumbent in red America this year."

On Election Day, Emerson defeated Sowers with 65% of the vote. After his congressional campaign, Sowers worked as the Senior Advisor to the Iraq and Afghanistan Veterans of America.  As Senior Advisor, Sowers represented his generation of veterans, speaking and attending various conferences from Renaissance Weekends, TED Global, Aspen Institute's security forum and the Clinton Global Initiative.

Political positions 
During his campaign, Sowers received national attention for his call to end the conventional war in Afghanistan, criticizing the objective of training the Afghanistan National Army and Police. In September 2010, Sowers appeared on Joe Scarborough's Morning Joe and The Ed Show to call for an end to the war in Afghanistan.  In October, he was profiled on the front page of the Washington Post. The article sympathized with the idea of “popular indifference” as the defining feature of the Nation’s engagement with the war, acknowledging Sowers uphill battle to get voters to recognize the war as a pressing issue and not just an unpleasant distant news item.

Volunteer Service 
After his 2010 Congressional campaign Sowers started working in the nonprofit sector with Iraq and Afghanistan War Veterans of America.

In 2015 he was elected to the Americans for the Arts Board of Directors for a three-year term. The organization focuses on the advancement of arts and arts education in America.

He is a co-creator of the Lincoln Awards a concert for Veterans & The Military Family that recognizes outstanding achievement and excellence in providing opportunities and support to our nation’s veterans and military families. It was nationally broadcast on PBS and hosted by the Kennedy Center.

From 2017-2018 he served on the board of the Entrepreneurs’ Organization in the Raleigh Durham chapter, where he is still a current member. EO is the World’s Only Peer-to-peer Network Exclusively for Entrepreneurs, The Entrepreneurs' Organization enables entrepreneurs to learn and grow from each other leading to greater business success and an enriched personal life.

Personal life 
Sowers resides in Kinston, North Carolina with his wife, four daughters and dogs.  He is an adventure racer and ultramarathoner.  He has also an accomplished sommelier, arborist, and pilot.

References

External links
Articles
 Livengood, Chad. "Sowers raises $204K in bid to challenge Emerson" , The Springfield News-Leader, October 13, 2009
 Martin, Jonathan. "Begala makes case for Dem vet on Vets' Day", POLITICO, November 11, 2009
 "DCCC Announces Twenty-Six Races to Watch" Swing State Project, January 15, 2010
 Keller, Rudi. "Sowers shrinking fundraising gap with Emerson", Southeast Missourian, April 18, 2010
 Klein, Joe. "The New Greatest Generation", Time Magazine, August 29, 2011
 Zoroya, Gregg. "Introducing the Lincoln: An award for veterans", USA Today, June 18, 2014

1976 births
Living people
Alumni of the London School of Economics
United States Army personnel of the Iraq War
American real estate businesspeople
American technology chief executives
American technology company founders
Businesspeople from Missouri
Sanford School of Public Policy alumni
Members of the United States Army Special Forces
Missouri Democrats
People from Rolla, Missouri
United States Army officers
United States Department of Veterans Affairs officials
United States Military Academy faculty